Rütsch is an area in the city of Hennef in the Rhein-Sieg district in North Rhine-Westphalia, Germany.

Location
The village lies in an altitude ranging from 131 to 167 meters above sea level on the slopes of the Westerwald, but is nevertheless a part of the Natural Park Bergisches Land.   Neighbouring villages are Kuchenbach and Lichtenberg.

History
In 1910 there were following households in Rutsch: farmer Maximilian Engels, factory worker Heinrich Meurer, mason Heinrich Stricker and mason Heinrich Wittkopp.

Until 1 August 1969 the village Rütsch belonged to the Uckerath municipality.   As a part of municipal reform of the Bonn area Uckerath, and thus also the village Rütsch, were assigned to the then-new independent municipality Hennef (Sieg).

References 

Quarters of Hennef (Sieg)